Émile Mousel (20 December 1843 – 15 October 1910) was a Luxembourgish politician and brewer. Mousel came from the famous Mousel family of brewers, and was mayor of Luxembourg City from 24 February 1894 until 24 July 1904.

Mayors of Luxembourg City
Businesspeople in brewing
1843 births
1910 deaths
People from Luxembourg City